Damitun may refer to:
 Damitun-e Bala
 Damitun-e Pain